The Moula Ali railway station (station code MLY) is located in Moula Ali, with a part of the station in Malkajgiri mandal, Hyderabad. It contains four cabins: Moula Ali A Cabin, Moula Ali B Cabin, Moula Ali Goods Cabin and Moula Ali Bypass (C)Cabin.

South Central Railway has developed Moula Ali railway station into an ‘Adarsh Station’. The facade of the station has been renovated. Special parking facilities are available for persons with disabilities and senior citizens.

References

Hyderabad railway division
Railway stations in Hyderabad, India